Ibn al-Mudabbir was the family name of two brothers who served in the 9th-century Abbasid court as officials:
 Ahmad ibn al-Mudabbir
 Ibrahim ibn al-Mudabbir